Daniel Joshua Goor (born April 28, 1975) is an American comedy writer and television producer.  He has written for several comedy talk shows including The Daily Show, Last Call with Carson Daly and Late Night with Conan O'Brien.  He also worked as a writer, producer, and director for NBC primetime series Parks and Recreation, and was executive-producer and co-creator of the  award-winning Fox/NBC series Brooklyn Nine-Nine. He is currently the executive-producer of the NBC series Grand Crew and the co-creator and co-showrunner of the Peacock series Killing It.

Personal life
Goor is Jewish. He married Purvi Harikant Shah in 2003 in an interfaith Jewish-Hindu ceremony.

Filmography

Parks and Recreation
 1.3: "The Reporter"
 2.10: "Hunting Trip"
 2.14: "Leslie's House"
 2.24: "Freddy Spaghetti"
 3.07: "Harvest Festival"
 3.16: "Li'l Sebastian"
 4.01: "I'm Leslie Knope"
 4.09: "The Trial of Leslie Knope"
 4:17: "Campaign Shake-Up"
 5.03: "How a Bill Becomes a Law"

Brooklyn Nine-Nine
 1.01: "Pilot"
 1.11: "Christmas"
 1.15: "Operation: Broken Feather"
 2.18: "Captain Peralta"
 3.23: "Greg and Larry" (Directed by)
 4.01: "Coral Palms: Part 1"
 4.23: "Crime and Punishment" (Directed by)
 5.04: "HalloVeen"
 5.22: "Jake & Amy" (also Directed by)
 6.18: "Suicide Squad" (also Directed by)
 7.13: "Lights Out" (also Directed by)
 8.10: "The Last Day: Part 2"

Killing It
 1.01: "Pilot"

References

External links
 

American television writers
American male television writers
American television producers
Living people
1975 births
Primetime Emmy Award winners
Showrunners
Screenwriters from Washington, D.C.
Harvard University alumni
21st-century American screenwriters
21st-century American male writers